The weightlifting competitions at the 2022 Bolivarian Games took place in the Polideportivo Colegio Andrés Escobar Court in Valledupar, Colombia from 1 to 5 July 2022.

Results

Men's 55 kg

Men's 61 kg

Men's 67 kg

Men's 73 kg

Men's 81 kg

Men's 89 kg

Men's 96 kg

Men's 102 kg

Men's 109 kg

Men's +109 kg

Women's 45 kg

Women's 49 kg

Women's 55 kg

Women's 59 kg

Women's 64 kg

Women's 71 kg

Women's 76 kg

Women's 81 kg

Women's 87 kg

Women's +87 kg

References

External links
  
Results XIX Bolivarian Games 

2022 Bolivarian Games